Netiv HaLamed-Heh (lit. Path of the 35) is a kibbutz in central Israel. Located in the Valley of Elah, it falls under the jurisdiction of Mateh Yehuda Regional Council.

History
Netiv HaLamed-Heh was established on 16 August 1949 by demobilised soldiers on land that had belonged to the depopulated Palestinian village of Bayt Nattif. The soldiers had been members of the 4th Company of the Palmach's Harel Brigade, and the settlement was initially named Peled (an acronym for Pluga Daled, lit. Daled Company, daled being the 4th letter of the Hebrew alphabet). It was later renamed after the 35 Haganah soldiers killed in a convoy sent to resupply the Gush Etzion kibbutzim during the 1947–48 Civil War (Lamed-Heh is 35 in Hebrew numerals).

In 2007, the Vertigo Dance Company has established the Vertigo Eco-Art Village as an educational center for ecology and arts at Kibbutz Netiv HaLamed-Heh.

Notable people

Yiftah Ron-Tal (born 1956), major general of the IDF (retired), head of the Port Authority (2007–2010) and the Israel Electric Corporation (since 2010)
Ya'akov Tzur (born 1956), former politician and government minister in the 1980s–1990s

See also
Khirbet Qeiyafa
Dance in Israel

References

External links

Kibbutz website 

Kibbutzim
Kibbutz Movement
Populated places established in 1949
Populated places in Jerusalem District
1949 establishments in Israel
Valley of Elah